Yves Mariot (5 July 1948 – 15 January 2000) was a French professional footballer who played as a striker. Born in Nancy, France, he began his career at AS Nancy and went on to play for Sedan, Lyon, Bastia, Paris FC, and Nice.

Marseille turn
Mariot is known for first popularising the Marseille turn in Europe during the 1970s.

See also
Marseille turn

References

External links
 Profile at French Football Federation 
 
 
 Profile 

1948 births
2000 deaths
French footballers
France international footballers
Association football forwards
AS Nancy Lorraine players
CS Sedan Ardennes players
Olympique Lyonnais players
SC Bastia players
Paris FC players
OGC Nice players
Ligue 1 players